Whitman College is one of seven residential colleges at Princeton University, New Jersey, United States. The college is named after Meg Whitman, a former CEO of eBay, who donated $30 million to build the college. The structures were designed by the architect  Demetri Porphyrios, the winner of the 2004 Driehaus Prize. Whitman College was completed in the fall of 2007, and first occupied during the 2007–08 academic year.

Whitman is a four-year residential college, open to students of all four academic classes.  Its sister two-year college is Forbes College.  Although it is possible for any upperclassman to live in Whitman, priority for housing room draw is given to those upperclassmen who lived in either Whitman or Forbes as underclassmen.

The current head of Whitman is Claire Gmachl; she is the Eugene Higgins Professor of Electrical Engineering at Princeton University. The master of Whitman was Harvey S. Rosen, the John L. Weinberg Professor of Economics and Business Policy.  The Dean is Dr. Rebecca Graves-Bayazitoglu, the former Director of Studies for Rockefeller College.  The Director of Studies is Dr. Justin Lorts and the Director of Student Life is Momo Wolapaye.  Josue Lajeunesse, a custodian at Whitman College, is a main subject of the documentary film The Philosopher Kings, and is also an active humanitarian working to make clean water accessible to the people of his home village of Lasource, Haiti.

The residential college comprises seven dormitories: South Baker Hall, Hargadon Hall, Fisher Hall, Lauritzen Hall, Class of 1981 Hall, Murley-Pivirotto Family Tower, and Wendell Hall.  The college's dining hall is called Community Hall, so named not for the University community but rather after the eBay community.

One of the more unusual aspects of the Whitman College system is its tradition of weekly "College Night" dinners, sponsored by the Whitman College Council and open to Whitman residents only. College Nights involve a number of different themes including Carnival, Halloween, and even a dinner themed after the NBC series "The Office". College Night dinners are popular among Whitman students but have sparked some controversy among the rest of the Princeton community.

Whitman College participates in seasonal intramural athletics, including soccer, volleyball and Ultimate Frisbee. Whitman also organizes a variety of other recreational activities, including a craft circle and the Jane Austen literary society.

In 2007, the college was criticized in a Bloomberg Businessweek article for its "over-the-top comforts."

References

External links

 Official website
 

Colleges of Princeton University
 2007 establishments in New Jersey
New Classical architecture